Evy may refer to:

 Evelyn (disambiguation), a female given name
 Evy Palm (born 1942), former Swedish long-distance athlete
 Evy Berggren (1934–2018), Swedish gymnast
 Evy Van Damme (born 1980), Belgian racing cyclist
 Evy-Ann Midttun (1943–2011), Norwegian politician
 Forest Evashevski (1918–2009), nicknamed "Evy", an American football player
 Evy á Lakjuni (born 1999), Faroese footballer
 Evy Kuijpers (born 1995), Dutch professional racing cyclist

 Eric Van Young, professor of history

 Edgardo Vega Yunqué (1936–2008), Puerto Rican writer
 Esther V. Yanai (1928–2003)
 Evy Goffin, member of Lasgo
 Evy Lynch,  (born 1991), Irish actress

 Evy Karlsson, a character in the Swedish comedy TV-show Full Frys
 Evy, a character in Go Fish
 Evy Lucío Córdova, the founder and director of San Juan Children's Choir

See also
 Eevee, a Pokémon
 Eevee (band), a Philippine band formed in 2004
 Evie (disambiguation)
 Eve (disambiguation)
 Evi (disambiguation)
 Ive (disambiguation)
 Ivy (disambiguation)
 Yve
 Ivey (disambiguation)